The Hugo Award for Best Short Story is one of the Hugo Awards given each year for science fiction or fantasy stories published or translated into English during the previous calendar year. The short story award is available for works of fiction of fewer than 7,500 words; awards are also given out for pieces of longer lengths in the novelette, novella, and novel categories. The Hugo Awards have been described as "a fine showcase for speculative fiction" and "the best known literary award for science fiction writing".

The Hugo Award for Best Short Story has been awarded annually since 1955, except in 1957. The award was titled "Best Short Fiction" rather than "Best Short Story" in 1960–1966. During this time no Novelette category was awarded and the Novella category had not yet been established; the award was defined only as a work "of less than novel length" that was not published as a stand-alone book. In addition to the regular Hugo awards, beginning in 1996 Retrospective Hugo Awards, or "Retro Hugos", have been available to be awarded for 50, 75, or 100 years prior. Retro Hugos may only be awarded for years after 1939 in which no awards were originally given. To date, Retro Hugo awards have been given for short stories for 1939, 1941, 1943–1946, 1951, and 1954.

During the 75 nomination years, 211 authors have had works nominated; 58 of these have won, including co-authors and Retro Hugos. Harlan Ellison has received the most Hugos for Best Short Story at four, Arthur C. Clarke, Larry Niven, Mike Resnick, Michael Swanwick, and Connie Willis have each won three times, and Poul Anderson, Joe Haldeman, and Ken Liu have won twice, the only other authors to win more than once. Resnick has received the most nominations at 18, while Swanwick has received 14; no other author has gotten more than 7. Michael A. Burstein, with 7, has the highest number of nominations without winning.

Selection
Hugo Award nominees and winners are chosen by supporting or attending members of the annual World Science Fiction Convention, or Worldcon, and the presentation evening constitutes its central event. The selection process is defined in the World Science Fiction Society Constitution as instant-runoff voting with six nominees, except in the case of a tie. The short stories on the ballot are the six most-nominated by members that year, with no limit on the number of stories that can be nominated. The 1955 and 1958 awards did not include any recognition of runner-up stories, but since 1959 all six candidates have been recorded. Initial nominations are made by members in January through March, while voting on the ballot of six nominations is performed roughly in April through July, subject to change depending on when that year's Worldcon is held. Prior to 2017, the final ballot was five works; it was changed that year to six, with each initial nominator limited to five nominations. Worldcons are generally held near Labor Day, and are held in a different city around the world each year. Members are permitted to vote "no award", if they feel that none of the nominees is deserving of the award that year, and in the case that "no award" takes the majority the Hugo is not given in that category. This happened in the Best Short Story category in 2015.

Winners and nominees 
In the following table, the years correspond to the date of the ceremony, rather than when the short story was first published. Each year links to the corresponding "year in literature" article. Entries with a blue background have won the award; those with a white background are the nominees on the short-list. If the short story was originally published in a book with other stories rather than by itself or in a magazine, the book title is included after the publisher's name. 

  *   Winners and joint winners
  +   No winner selected

Retro Hugos 
Beginning with the 1996 Worldcon, the World Science Fiction Society created the concept of "Retro Hugos", in which the Hugo award could be retroactively awarded for years 50, 75, or 100 years before the current year, if no awards were originally given that year. Retro Hugos have been awarded eight times, for 1939, 1941, 1943–1946, 1951, and 1954.

See also
Nebula Award for Best Short Story

Notes

References

External links
Hugo Award official site
List of Hugo Award nominees in Locus magazine

Short Story
Short story awards